Wes Craven's New Nightmare (also known simply as New Nightmare) is a 1994 American meta slasher film written and directed by Wes Craven, creator of 1984's A Nightmare on Elm Street. A standalone film and the seventh installment in the A Nightmare on Elm Street franchise, it is not part of the same continuity as previous films, instead portraying Freddy Krueger as a fictional movie villain who invades the real world and haunts the cast and crew involved in the making of the films about him. In the film, Freddy is depicted as closer to what Craven originally intended, being much more menacing and less comical, with an updated attire and appearance.

The film features various people involved in the motion picture industry portraying themselves, including Heather Langenkamp, who is compelled by events in the narrative to reprise her role as Nancy Thompson. New Nightmare features several homages to the original film such as quotes and recreations of the most famous scenes. The film won an International Fantasy Film Award from Fantasporto for Best Screenplay by Craven.

New Nightmare was released on October 14, 1994, grossing $19.8 million at the box office on a budget of $8 million, making it the poorest-performing film in the Nightmare series. However, it received positive reviews from critics, and is considered by many as one of the best Nightmare movies and one of Wes Craven's most enduring films. It was followed by 2003's Freddy vs. Jason, a crossover with the Friday the 13th franchise set in the same continuity as the other Nightmare films.

Plot
Heather Langenkamp lives in Los Angeles, California, with her husband Chase and their young son Dylan. She is recognized for her role as Nancy Thompson from the A Nightmare on Elm Street film series before focusing her career on television. One night, she has a nightmare that her family is attacked by a set of animated Freddy Krueger claws from an upcoming Nightmare film, where two workers are brutally killed on set. Waking up to an earthquake, she spies a cut on Chase's finger exactly like the one he had received in her dream, but she quickly dismisses the notion that it was caused by the claws.

Heather receives a call from an obsessed fan who quotes Freddy Krueger's nursery rhyme in an eerie, Freddy-like voice. This coincides with a meeting she has with New Line Cinema where she is pitched the idea to reprise her role as Nancy in a new Nightmare film, which, unbeknownst to her, Chase has been working on. She returns home, and sees Dylan watching her original film, and Dylan has a severely traumatizing episode where he screams at her. The frequent calls and Dylan's strange behavior cause her to call Chase, and he agrees to rush home from his workplace at Palm Springs as the two men from the opening dream did not report in for work. Chase falls asleep while driving and is slashed by Freddy's claw and dies. His death seems to affect Dylan even further, which concerns Heather's long-time friend and former co-star John Saxon. He suggests she seek medical attention for Dylan and herself after she has a nightmare at Chase's funeral in which Freddy tries to take Dylan away.

Dylan's health continues to deteriorate, becoming increasingly paranoid about going to sleep, and fearing Freddy Krueger, even though Heather has never shown Dylan her films. She visits Nightmare creator Wes Craven, who admits to having precognitive nightmares that the films captured an ancient supernatural entity, which has now been freed after the film series ended with the release of Freddy's Dead: The Final Nightmare. In the guise of Freddy, the entity now focuses its primary foe on Heather, as killing her will allow it into the real world. Robert Englund, who portrayed Freddy in the films, also has a strange knowledge of it, describing the new Freddy to Heather, then disappearing from all contact shortly thereafter.

Following another earthquake, Heather takes a traumatized Dylan to the hospital, where Dr. Heffner, suspecting abuse, suggests he remain under observation. Heather returns home for Dylan's stuffed dinosaur while his babysitter Julie tries unsuccessfully to keep the nurses from sedating the sleep-deprived boy. After Dylan falls asleep from the sedative, Freddy brutally kills Julie in Dylan's dream. Capable of sleepwalking, Dylan leaves the hospital of his own accord while Heather chases him home across the interstate as Freddy taunts and dangles him before traffic. Upon returning home, Heather realizes that reality is starting to overlap with Freddy's make-believe realm, with Saxon as Nancy's father Don Thompson, and her street, the exterior of her house, and her clothes have all transformed into Nancy's. When Heather embraces Nancy's role, Freddy emerges completely into reality and abducts Dylan to his world. Heather finds a trail of Dylan's sleeping pills and follows him to a hellish construct of Freddy's boiler room. Freddy fights off Heather and chases Dylan into a furnace. Dylan escapes the furnace, doubles back to Heather, and together they push Freddy into the furnace and light it, destroying both the monster and its reality.

Dylan and Heather emerge from under his blankets, and Heather finds a copy of the recent events in a screenplay at the foot of the bed. Inside is written thanks from Wes for defeating Freddy and playing Nancy one last time. Her victory helps imprison the entity of the film franchise's fictitious world once more. Dylan asks if it is a story, and Heather agrees before opening the script and reading from its pages.

Cast

 Heather Langenkamp as herself and Nancy Thompson. Following her initial success in both the original Nightmare on Elm Street and The Dream Warriors, Langenkamp took on the role of Marie Lubbock in the ABC sitcom Just the Ten of Us, however she was later stalked by an obsessed fan who was unhappy the series was cancelled, leading to her temporarily moving to England. In the film, Langenkamp's character is also stalked through harassing phone calls.
 Robert Englund as himself and The Entity / "Freddy Krueger". Englund's performance as Freddy is notably toned down in this film compared to its predecessors, with less focus on comedic quips and more on the sinister aspect of his character. The Krueger costume was also altered to become darker with more "organic" makeup and a revised glove. In the film, Englund also plays himself as both an actor and painter. According to the 2010 documentary Never Sleep Again, a scripted but ultimately unfilmed sequence would have seen Englund transformed into a fly and trapped in the web of a giant "Freddy-spider" in an homage to the 1958 film The Fly. The sequence was not shot due to time and budgetary constraints.
 Miko Hughes as Dylan Porter. Hughes plays the son of Heather Langenkamp and Chase Porter whose mental health begins to deteriorate after his encounters with Freddy. Hughes was no stranger to horror films, having previously acted in the role of Gage Creed in the 1989 film Pet Sematary. 
 John Saxon as himself and Donald Thompson. Since his previous appearances in the Elm Street films, Saxon had kept himself busy primarily with lower budget movies and TV work; he was keen to appear in New Nightmare as he thought it likely to be the last film in the Elm Street saga. In the film, Saxon plays himself and gives onscreen daughter Langenkamp some advice about how to best treat her son Dylan. 
 Tracy Middendorf as Julie. Middendorf plays Julie, Dylan's babysitter and Heather's best friend. According to Middendorf in the Never Sleep Again documentary, she was created in part to act as a red herring regarding Heather's stalker; film editor Patrick Lussier revealed in the same documentary that Julie was originally scripted to be working as an avatar for Freddy but this was ultimately changed to her being killed by him. Julie's death mimics that of Tina Grey from the original film, with a rotating room again being used to simulate Freddy dragging her across the ceiling. 
 David Newsom as Chase Porter. In the film, Newsom plays Chase Porter, Heather's husband and a special effects artist working for New Line Cinema. The role of Chase was originally offered to Heather Langenkamp's real life husband David LeRoy Anderson but he declined as it would be "too close to the bone". Newsom recalled in 2010 how he looked nothing like a typical special effects artists who tended to be bigger than him with longer hair.
 Fran Bennett as Dr. Christine Heffner. Bennett, an accomplished film and theatre actress, plays Dr. Heffner who initially suspects that Heather may be inadvertently harming her child herself. Wes Craven named Bennett's character after former MPAA ratings chief Richard Heffner, with whom he had clashed many times over the censorship of his films. 
 Wes Craven as himself. Director Craven initially scripted himself as a man driven insane by nightmares, who had cut off his own eyelids to stay awake and was being driven by Michael Berryman's character from The Hills Have Eyes. Craven decided to opt for a more comforting setting of being in an opulent house in the Hollywood Hills. 
 Robert Shaye as himself. Shaye appears as himself in order to convince Heather Langenkamp to take part in the new Nightmare on Elm Street film. Shaye would later remark in the Never Sleep Again documentary, "I don't think I did a particularly good job, but I was okay". Shaye had previously appeared as a bartender at an S&M themed bar in Nightmare on Elm Street Part 2: Freddy's Revenge, as a teacher in Nightmare on Elm Street 4, as a ticket seller in Freddy's Dead and a funeral minister in the Freddy's Nightmares episode "Killer Instinct" (credited as L.E Moko). 
 Marianne Maddalena as herself
 Sam Rubin as himself
 Sara Risher as herself
 Claudia Haro as a New Line Cinema receptionist
 Matt Winston and Rob LaBelle as Charles "Chuck" Wilson and Terrance "Terry" Feinstein, two special effects workers
 W. Earl Brown as Morgue attendant
 Lin Shaye as Nurse with pill; Shaye played the teacher in the original film and, according to Never Sleep Again, was pleased to return as another "generic public servant". 
 Nick Corri as himself; Corri played Rod in the original film and is silently present during the funeral scene.
 Tuesday Knight as herself; Knight played Kristen Parker in the fourth film and is silently present during the funeral scene.

Production

Written under the working title A Nightmare on Elm Street 7: The Ascension, Wes Craven set out to make a deliberately more cerebral film than recent entries to the franchise—which he regarded as being cartoonish, and not faithful to his original themes. The basic premise originated when Craven first signed on to co-write Dream Warriors, but New Line Cinema rejected it then.

In New Nightmare, Krueger was portrayed closer to what Craven had imagined: darker and less comical. To reinforce this, the character's make-up and outfit were enhanced, with one of the most prominent differences being that he now wears a long blue/black trenchcoat. In addition, the signature glove was redesigned for a more organic look, with the fingers resembling bones and having muscle textures in between. While Robert Englund again plays the character, "Freddy Krueger" is credited as "Himself" in the end credits.

While earthquake scenes were already written into the film from the beginning, production of the film happened to take place concurrently with the 1994 Northridge earthquake in Los Angeles. As such, the production team decided to incorporate real footage of the earthquake's structural damage into the film.

Craven had intended to ask Johnny Depp, whose feature film debut was in the first film, to make an appearance as himself, but was too timid to ask him. Upon running into each other after the film's release, Depp said he would have been happy to do it.

Craven kept most of the wardrobe from the first film as souvenirs before New Line Cinema threw them all away, and reused some of it for New Nightmare.

Both New Line Executive Sara Risher and director Craven said that the shoot was relatively easy and free from complications. Reflecting on the filming in Never Sleep Again some sixteen years after the movie was released, Risher commented "all of the other directors had to be guided through but Wes by then was the master". The film's self-referential style would be explored further in the following year's Scream, also directed by Craven.

The film was made for the celebration of the 10th anniversary of the original film's release. Both New Nightmare and the 1995 comedy film Tommy Boy were dedicated to the production designer of A Nightmare on Elm Street, Gregg Fonseca (1952 - 1994), who died shortly before the release of New Nightmare.

Release

Home media
This film was released on January 27, 1995,VHS by New Line Home Video, was released on August 22, 2000, DVD, by New Line Home Entertainment.

Reception

Box office
On the film's opening weekend it made $6.6 million, ranking third at the box office. It went on to gross $19.8 million worldwide, making it the poorest-performing film in the A Nightmare on Elm Street film series. In the 2010 documentary Never Sleep Again, it is suggested that the film opening against Pulp Fiction may also have damaged its potential box office.

Critical response

On review aggregator Rotten Tomatoes, 79% of 42 reviews are positive, with an average rating of 6.4/10. The website's critics consensus reads: "Wes Craven's New Nightmare adds an unexpectedly satisfying - not to mention intelligent - meta layer to a horror franchise that had long since lost its way." On Metacritic, the film has a weighted average score of 64 out of 100 based on 21 critics, indicating "generally favorable reviews". Several critics have subsequently said that New Nightmare could be regarded as a prelude to the Scream series—both sets of films deal with the idea of bringing horror films to "real life", and both were directed by Wes Craven.

Roger Ebert of the Chicago Sun-Times gave New Nightmare three stars out of four and said, "I haven't been exactly a fan of the Nightmare series, but I found this movie, with its unsettling questions about the effect of horror on those who create it, strangely intriguing." Ebert's review partner Gene Siskel was less complimentary of the film, giving it a thumbs-down rating on Siskel & Ebert and stating that it was "campy" and he did not find Freddy a particularly compelling villain. Kevin Sommerfield from the horror website Slasher Studios gave it four out of four stars and said, "New Nightmare is that rare horror film in which everything works. The performances are pitch perfect, led by a tour-de-force performance by the amazing Langenkamp. The script has many twists and turns and the movie is quite possibly the best looking of the entire series."

Entertainment Weeklys Owen Gleiberman gave New Nightmare a negative review, stating: "After a good, gory opening, in which Freddy's glove—newly designed with sinews and muscles—slashes the throat of the special-effects guy who's been working on it, the movie succumbs to a kind of sterile inertia. Wes Craven's New Nightmare isn't about Freddy haunting a film set, which actually might have been fun. It's about Heather Langenkamp, star of the original Nightmare on Elm Street, being menaced for two long, slow hours by earthquakes, cracks in the wall, and other weary portents of doom." Gleiberman described the film as "just an empty hall of mirrors" that "lacks the trancelike dread of the original" and the "ingeniously demented special effects" of Dream Warriors. In a retrospective review, Vinnie Mancuso from Collider singled out the film as "Craven's meta-horror masterpiece".

New Nightmare is Robert Englund's favorite Nightmare movie:"I think it stands the test of time, a fun reunion with original cast members like Heather and John Saxon. Wes's script is clever and original, the self-referencial horror story." Heather Langenkamp is also very supportive of the movie, saying:"I was just really shocked that I was in the movie so much, I had totally forgotten I was the star of that movie. It was interesting because all my scenes are kind of alone, and I was acting against this tension and this idea of Freddy that we all had at that time. We all knew what I was afraid of and that Freddy might be back, but you never really saw Freddy that much, and I was really amazed that the movie was about Wes [Craven] creating this relationship with that idea that Freddy is here, and the audience has it too. It's a really interesting concept, and it's one of the only horror movies where the monster's really in the background, at least until the end. But it's all about our mentality about fear."

Accolades
Nominated for Best Film - 10th Independent Spirit Awards

Year-end lists 
 Top 3 "Best in-your-face exploitation" (not ranked) –  Glenn Lovell, San Jose Mercury News
 Honorable mention – Howie Movshovitz, The Denver Post
 Top 18 worst (alphabetically listed, not ranked) – Michael Mills, The Palm Beach Post

See also
 List of ghost films
 List of monster movies
 Postmodern horror

References

External links

 
 
 
 

1994 films
1994 horror films
1990s slasher films
American supernatural horror films
American slasher films
American sequel films
1990s English-language films
A Nightmare on Elm Street (franchise) films
Films about child abduction in the United States
Films about child abuse
Films about filmmaking
Films about earthquakes
Films about nightmares
Films about precognition
Self-reflexive films
Films directed by Wes Craven
Films set in Los Angeles
Films set in Pasadena, California
Films scored by J. Peter Robinson
Insomnia in film
New Line Cinema films
Metafictional works
1990s American films